The men's 74 kg (162.8 lbs) Light-Contact category at the W.A.K.O. World Championships 2007 in Belgrade was the fourth lightest of the male Light-Contact tournaments being roughly comparable to the middleweight division when compared to Low-Kick and K-1's weight classes.  There were fifteen men taking part in the competition, all based in Europe.  Each of the matches was three rounds of two minutes each and were fought under Light-Contact rules.

As there were too few fighters for a tournament designed for sixteen, one of the men had a bye through to the quarter finals.  The tournament gold medalist was Russian Sergey Zhukov who beat Poland's Jerzy Wronski by split decision in the final.  The two bronze medalists were Ireland's Kieran Ryan and Slovakian Martin Muravsky.

Results

Key

See also
List of WAKO Amateur World Championships
List of WAKO Amateur European Championships
List of male kickboxers

References

External links
 WAKO World Association of Kickboxing Organizations Official Site

Kickboxing events at the WAKO World Championships 2007 Belgrade
2007 in kickboxing
Kickboxing in Serbia